Maurice Herbert Dobb (24 July 1900 – 17 August 1976) was an English economist at Cambridge University and a Fellow of Trinity College, Cambridge. He is remembered as one of the pre-eminent Marxist economists of the 20th century.

Biography
Dobb was born on 24 July 1900 in London, the son of Walter Herbert Dobb and the former Elsie Annie Moir. He and his family lived in the London suburb of Willesden. He was educated at Charterhouse School in Surrey, an elite British public school.

Dobb began writing after the death of his mother in his early teens. His introversion hindered him from building a network of friends. His earliest novels were fictional fantasies. Much like his father, Dobb initiated practice in Christian Science after his mother's death; the family had previously belonged to the Presbyterian Church.

Saved from military conscription by the Armistice of November 1918, Dobb was admitted to Pembroke College, Cambridge, in 1919 as an exhibitioner to read economics. He gained firsts in both parts of the economics tripos in 1921 and 1922 and was admitted to the London School of Economics for graduate studies. After gaining a PhD in 1924, Dobb returned to Cambridge as university lecturer.

In 1920, after Dobb's first year at Pembroke College, John Maynard Keynes invited him to join the Political Economy Club, and after graduation Keynes helped him secure his Cambridge position. Dobb was open with students about his communist beliefs. One of them, Victor Kiernan, later reported, "We had no time then to assimilate Marxist theory more than very roughly; it was only beginning to take root in England, although it had one remarkable expounder at Cambridge in Maurice Dobb." Dobb's house, "St Andrews" in Chesterton Lane, was a frequent meeting place for Cambridge communists, known locally as "The Red House".

Dobb joined the Communist Party in 1920 and in the 1930s was central to the burgeoning Communist movement at the university. One recruit was Kim Philby, who later became a high-placed mole within British intelligence. It has been suggested that Dobb was a "talent-spotter" for Comintern. Dobb was a highly placed communist revolutionary in Britain at the time. He was politically very active and spent much time organizing rallies and presenting lectures on a consistent basis. As an economist commonly focused on vulnerability to economic crisis and pointed to the United States as a case of capitalist money assisting military agendas instead of public works.

Career
Dobb's position at Trinity connected him to it for more than 50 years. He was elected a fellow in 1948, at which time he began joint work with Piero Sraffa assembling the selected works and letters of David Ricardo. The results were eventually published in eleven volumes. He did not receive a university readership until 1959.

Over his career he published twelve academic books, more than 24 pamphlets and numerous articles for general audiences. He often wrote on political economy, drawing a connection between the social context and problems in society and how that influences market exchange. "Economic relations of men determine social associations of men," he said in his Marxian economics class. Dobb believed the capitalist system created classes and with class came class warfare. After a 1925 trip to Russia with Keynes, Dobb refrained slightly from his interests in political conflict; he was notorious for long and dull lectures with few students present.

Other positions held by Dobb around 1928 include teaching in a summer school, acting as Chairman of the Faculty of Economics of the Communist Party of Great Britain, and helping to launch the party's own film company. He encountered differing opinions within the party, pushing that intellect and political activity are not mutually exclusive.

In 1931, Dobb married Barbara Marian Nixon as a second wife for the rest of his life. She never claimed to be a communist, but was active in the Labour Party and held a seat on London County Council while pursuing a career in acting. Dobb's personal life was of particular interest to his colleagues, and due to the controversy Pembroke College dropped Dobb as a Director of Studies and withdrew his dining rights. In the same year he gave a lecture on his recent trip to Russia, which prompted some to call him a "paid official of the Russian government", again causing a small scandal at Cambridge. Dobb responded with an article in The Times claiming no connection with the Soviet Union.

The Hogarth Press
The Hogarth Press, founded by Virginia and Leonard Woolf, was a printing press intent on publishing items that encouraged free exchange of ideas. Leonard Woolf himself was an anti-imperialist. He also believed intellectual exchange was the same as economical exchange in material form; Dobb's publications were both intellectual exchange through introduction and defense of Marxism and pieces of work that could be sold. Publications possibly reflected the opinions of Leonard and Virginia Woolf. Leonard Woolf later commissioned The Political and Social Doctrine of Communism, having originally asked Maurice Dobb and another author, who both refused. Between "1924 and the late 1930s, the Hogarth Press published eight pamphlets on Russia, communism, and Marxism… the motives, supported by Leonard Woolf, were political and educational."

Dobb published two pamphlets with Hogarth Press. The first, Russia To-day and Tomorrow (1930), was written after his return from Russia with Keynes. He comments on the Soviet economy, politics, industry, and culture in what became a strong seller in the 1930s. His second pamphlet, On Marxism To-Day (1932) was intended as a rudimentary introduction to communism directed to the general public.

Death and legacy
Maurice Dobb died on 17 August 1976. By then he had started to question his earlier devotion to Russia's economics.

His socialist ideals, however, did not die with him. He had two notable students, Amartya Sen and Eric Hobsbawm. Sen won the Nobel Memorial Prize in Economic Sciences in 1998 and Bharat Ratna in 1999 for his work in welfare economics, and the inaugural Charleston-EFG John Maynard Keynes Prize for his work on welfare economics. Sen became Master of Trinity College (1998-2004), Dobb's own college. Hobsbawm attended the University of Cambridge, and was a Marxist historiographer producing numerous works on Marxism and being active in the Communist Party Historians Group and the Communist Party of Great Britain.

Economic thought
Dobb was an economist primarily involved in interpreting neoclassical economic theory from a Marxist point of view. His involvement in the original economic calculation problem debate consisted of critiques of capitalist, centrally planned socialist or market socialist models based on the neoclassical framework of static equilibrium.

He was also critical of the marginalist thought within neoclassical economics. Since Marx's death, this had become popular within the field, with Dobb arguing on behalf of Marx. Marginal utility, the main foundation of marginalism, posits a way to quantify levels of satisfaction as a person consumes each additional unit of a good. The level of satisfaction also depends on the person's behaviour. These ideas showed that the prices set for goods are more, if not completely, influenced by individual willingness to spend. The perceived value an individual gives to a good is the opposite of Marx's labour theory of value described in Value, Price, Profit, which states that the price for a good is set by the amount of socially acceptable labour that goes into production.

In Dobb's Theories of Value and Distribution Since Adam Smith: Ideology and Economic Theory, he argued that marginal utility and individual satisfaction cannot determine prices, as marginalism suggests. He saw a person's preferences and level of satisfaction as heavily dependent on individual wealth, so that marginal utility is determined by spending power. This, according to Dobb, was the distribution of wealth that could alone change prices, as price depended on how much someone would spend. So he argued that individual behaviour cannot influence prices, as there are many other factors such as labour and spending power to affect them. Dobb dismissed the market-socialist model of Oskar Lange and contributions of "neo-classical" socialists as illegitimate "narrowing of the focus of study to problems of exchange-relations."

Many of Dobb's works have appeared in other languages. His short Introduction to Economics was translated into Spanish by the Mexican intellectual Antonio Castro Leal for the leading Mexican publisher Fondo de Cultura Economica, and has gone through more than ten editions since 1938.

For Dobb, the central economic challenges for socialism relate to production and investment in their dynamic aspects. He identified three major advantages of planned economies: antecedent co-ordination, external effects and variables in planning.

Antecedent co-ordination
Planned economies employ antecedent co-ordination of the economy, whereas a market economy atomises its agents by definition and the expectations that form the basis of their decisions are always based on uncertainty. There is a poverty of information that often leads to disequilibrium and can only be corrected in a market ex post (after the event), so that resources are wasted.

An advantage of antecedent planning is removal of marked degrees of uncertainty in a context of coordinated and unified information-gathering and decision-making prior to the commitment of resources.

External effects
Dobb was an early theorist to recognise the relevance of external effects to market exchanges. In a market economy, each economic agent in an exchange makes decisions based on a narrow range of information in ignorance of wider social effects of production and consumption.

When external effects are significant, this invalidates the information transmitting qualities of market prices, so that prices do not reflect true social-opportunity costs. Dobbs claimed that contrary to the convenient assumptions of mainstream economists, significant external effects are in fact pervasive in modern market economies. Planning that coordinates interrelated decisions before their implementation can take into account a wider range of social effects. This has important applications for efficient industrial planning, including decisions about the external effects of uneven development between sectors, and in terms of the external effects of public works, and for development of infant industries; this is in addition to widely publicised negative external effects on the environment.

Variables in planning
By taking the complex of factors into consideration, only coordinated antecedent planning allows for fluid allocation where things that appear as "data" in static frameworks can be used as variables in a planning process. By way of example one can enumerate the following categories of "data" that under coordinated antecedent plan will assume the form of variables that can be adjusted in the plan according to circumstances: rate of investment, distribution of investment between capital and consumption, choices of production techniques, geographical distribution of investment and relative rates of growth of transport, fuel and power, and of agriculture in relation to industry, the rate of introduction of new products, and their character, and the degree of standardisation or variety in production that the economy at its stage of development feels it can afford.

Footnotes

Works
Capitalist Enterprise and Social Progress, 1925
Russian Economic Development since the Revolution. Assisted by H. C. Stevens. London: G. Routledge & Sons, 1928.
Wages, 1928
"A skeptical view of the theory of wages", 1929, Economic Journal
Russia To-Day and Tomorrow, 1930, The Hogarth Press
On Marxism To-Day, 1932, The Hogarth Press
 
Political Economy and Capitalism: Some essays in economic tradition, 1937
Soviet Planning and Labour in Peace and War: Four Studies. London: George Routledge & Sons, 1942
"How Soviet Trade Unions Work." San Francisco: International Bookshop, n.d. [1942]. Leaflet
Marx as an Economist: An Essay. London: Lawrence and Wishart, 1943
Soviet Economy and the War. New York: International Publishers, 1943
Studies in the Development of Capitalism, 1946
Soviet Economic Development Since 1917, 1948
Reply (to Paul Sweezy's article on the transition from feudalism to capitalism), 1950, Science and Society
Some Aspects of Economic Development, 1951
Economic Theory and Socialism: Collected Papers, 1955
An Essay on Economic Growth and Planning, 1960
Economic Growth and Underdeveloped Countries. New York: International Publishers, 1963
Papers on Capitalism, Development and Planning, 1967
Welfare Economics and the Economics of Socialism, 1969
"The Sraffa System and Critique of the Neoclassical Theory of Distribution", 1970, De Economist
Socialist Planning: Some Problems. 1970
Theories of Value and Distribution Since Adam Smith: Ideology and Economic Theory. London: Cambridge University Press, 1973
"Some Historical Reflections on Planning and the Market," in Chimen Abramsky (ed.), Essays in Honour of E. H. Carr, London, Macmillan Press, 1974
An Essay on Economic Growth and Planning. London: Routledge & Kegan Paul, 1976
The Development of Socialist Economic Thought: Selected Essays. London: Lawrence and Wishart, 2008
 A Contribution to the Critique of Political Economy, was edited by Maurice Dobb in English language.

Further reading
Dubino, J. (2010). Virginia Woolf and the Literary Marketplace. New York, New York: Palgrave Macmillan
Eatwell, J., Murray Milgate, & Peter Newman, (eds.) (1990) The New Palgrave. Marxian Economics. New York, NY: W.W. Norton and Company
Feinstein, C. (ed.) (1967). Socialism, Capitalism and Economic Growth: Essays Presented to Maurice Dobb. Cambridge: Cambridge University Press
Hobsbawm, E.J. (1967). "Maurice Dobb." In Feinstein (1967)
Hollander, Samuel. (2008). The Economics of Karl Marx: Analysis and Application. Cambridge: Cambridge University Press
Howard, M.C. & King, J.E. (1992). A History of Marxian Economics, Volume II: 1929-1990 Princeton, NJ: Princeton University Press
Maurice Dobb Memorial Issue. (1978). Cambridge Journal of Economics, 2(2), June
Meeks, Ronald. (1978). Obituary of Maurice Herbert Dobb. Proceedings of the British Academy 1977, 53, 333-44
Pollitt, B.H. (1985). Clearing the path for ‘Production of Commodities by Means of Commodities’: Notes on the Collaboration of Maurice Dobb in Piero Sraffa's edition of 'The Works and Correspondence of David Ricardo'''. Mimeographed
Sen, Amartya. (1990). "Maurice Herbert Dobb." In Eatwell, Milgate, & Newman, (1990)
Shenk, Timothy. (2013). Maurice Dobb: Political Economist. London: Palgrave Macmillan
Shenk, Timothy. (2013). "A Marxist in Keynes' Court". Jacobin Magazine. October 9 issue
Sraffa, P. (1960). Production of Commodities by Means of Commodities: Prelude to a Critique of Economic Theory. Cambridge: Cambridge University Press
Sraffa, P., with the collaboration of M.H. Dobb. (1951–73). Works and Correspondence of David Ricardo. 11 vols, Cambridge: Cambridge University Press

External links
Papers of Maurice Herbert Dobb
Maurice Dobb Archive at marxists.org
“The Development of Capitalism”, by Maurice Dobb
The Transition from Feudalism to Capitalism: A Contribution to the Sweezy-Dobb Controversy H. K. Takahashi and Henry F. Mins. Science & Society'' Vol. 16, No. 4 (Fall, 1952), pp. 313–345

British economists
Marxian economists
Historians of economic thought
1900 births
1976 deaths
People educated at Charterhouse School
British Marxists
Alumni of Pembroke College, Cambridge
Academics of the University of Cambridge
Fellows of Trinity College, Cambridge
Communist Party of Great Britain members
20th-century British historians
Members of the German Academy of Sciences at Berlin
Communist Party Historians Group members